Garrett Miller (born June 7, 1977 in Philadelphia, Pennsylvania) is an American rower. He finished 5th in the Men's eight at the 2000 Summer Olympics.

References 
 
 

1977 births
Living people
Rowers from Philadelphia
Olympic rowers of the United States
Rowers at the 2000 Summer Olympics
World Rowing Championships medalists for the United States
American male rowers